Tinagma columbella is a moth in the  family Douglasiidae. It is found in Ukraine.

References

Douglasiidae
Moths described in 1880